Bonyhád Völgység Labdarúgó Club is a football club based in Bonyhád, Tolna County, Hungary, that competes in the county championship, the third tier of Hungarian football.

Name changes
Bonyhádi Vasas (1951 - 1957)
Bonyhádi MSC (1957 - 1957)
Bonyhádi Munkás TE (1957 - 1958)
Bonyhádi Vasas (1958 - 1981)
Bonyhádi Munkásszövetkezeti SC (1981 - 1985)
in 1985 merger with Bonyhádi Pannónia SE
Bonyhádi SE (1985 - 1996)
Bonyhádi FC (1996 - 1998)
Bonyhád Agraco FC (1998 - 2001)
Bonyhád Völgység Labdarúgó Club (2001 - present)

History
Bonyhád lost 3–2 to Monori SE in the 2020-21 Magyar Kupa season.

External links
 Official website of Bonyhád VLC
 Profile on Magyar Futball

References

Football clubs in Hungary
Association football clubs established in 1951
1951 establishments in Hungary